Santa Clara station is a light rail station operated by Santa Clara Valley Transportation Authority (VTA) located in the Historic District of Downtown San Jose, California on 1st and 2nd Streets just south of Santa Clara Street. The northbound platform is on 1st Street; the southbound platform is on 2nd Street. The platforms are connected via a pedestrian paseo called Fountain Alley. This station is served by the Blue and Green lines of the VTA Light Rail system.

Santa Clara station is a major transit transfer point in the VTA system. Downtown San José station, a proposed underground Bay Area Rapid Transit station, is planned to be co-located with the existing VTA station.

History 
VTA closed the station for refurbishment from January to May 2007 to allow level boarding at all doors, thus making the station fully wheelchair accessible.

Santa Clara station is planned as a future transfer point between BART (in the second, unfunded phase of an extension from Fremont) and VTA light rail. The BART downtown San Jose subway station is proposed to be built under Santa Clara Street.

Service

Station layout

Notable places nearby 
The station is within walking distance of the following notable places:
Fountain Alley

References

External links 

Santa Clara Valley Transportation Authority light rail stations
Railway stations in San Jose, California
Railway stations in the United States opened in 1987
1987 establishments in California